The 1987–88 Maltese Premier League was the 8th season of the Maltese Premier League, and the 73rd season of top-tier football in Malta. It was contested by 8 teams, and Hamrun Spartans F.C. won the championship.

League standings

Results

References
Malta - List of final tables (RSSSF)

Maltese Premier League seasons
Malta
1987–88 in Maltese football